Samuel Roberts Davison (23 February 1884 – 17 January 1963) was an Australian rules footballer who played with Fitzroy in the Victorian Football League (VFL).

Notes

External links 

1884 births
1963 deaths
Australian rules footballers from Victoria (Australia)
Fitzroy Football Club players
Preston Football Club (VFA) players